The men's 800 metres event at the 2015 Asian Athletics Championships was held on the 6 and 7 of June.

Medalists

Results

Heats
First 2 in each heat (Q) and the next 2 fastest (q) qualified for the final.

Final

References

800
800 metres at the Asian Athletics Championships